Hussein Khodor Ibrahim (born 13 March 1993) is a Lebanese footballer who plays as a midfielder and captains  club Bourj.

Honours
Ansar
 Lebanese FA Cup: 2011–12, 2016–17
 Lebanese Super Cup: 2012; runner-up: 2017
 Lebanese Elite Cup runner-up: 2016

Bourj
 Lebanese Challenge Cup: 2019
 Lebanese Second Division: 2018–19

References

External links

 
 
 
 

1993 births
Living people
Footballers from Beirut
Lebanese footballers
Association football forwards
Al Ansar FC players
Bourj FC players
Lebanese Premier League players
Lebanon international footballers
Lebanese Second Division players